Aukštdvaris ('high manor', formerly) is a village in Kėdainiai district municipality, in Kaunas County, in central Lithuania. According to the 2011 census, the village had a population of 126 people.

History
Bracelets of the 3rd-4th centuries has been found nearby Aukštdvaris. On 17 March, 1863 there was a big battle between the January Uprising insurgents and Tsarist army. There was the Aukštdvaris manor. It belonged to the Jelenski family, then since 1805 to the Belozior, and then to the Podbereski. In 1877 a wheel and cart making factory was opened in the manor.

During the Soviet era it was a subsidiary settlement of the "Oak" kolkhoz.

Demography

References

Villages in Kaunas County
Kėdainiai District Municipality